Vanina Paola Sánchez Berón (born March 13, 1979 in San Martín de los Andes, Neuquén) is an Argentine taekwondo practitioner. She is a three-time medalist at the Pan American Games, and a silver medalist for the 60 kg division at the 1995 World Taekwondo Championships in Manila, Philippines.

Sanchez made her official debut for the 2004 Summer Olympics in Athens, where she competed in the women's welterweight category (67 kg). She lost the first preliminary match to Philippines' Mary Antoinette Rivero by a superiority decision from the judges, with a score of 10–10.

At the 2008 Summer Olympics in Beijing, Sanchez qualified for the second time in the women's 67 kg class after winning the championship title from the Pan American Qualification Tournament in Cali, Colombia. Sanchez improved her performance from the previous games by defeating Turkey's Sibel Güler in the preliminary round; however, she lost her next match to Canada's Karine Sergerie, who was able to score three points at the end of the game. Because Sergerie advanced further into the final match against South Korea's Hwang Kyung-Seon, Sanchez offered another shot for the bronze medal through the repechage bout, where she was defeated by Australia's Tina Morgan, with a default score of 2–9.

References

External links
 

NBC 2008 Olympics profile

Argentine female taekwondo practitioners
1979 births
Living people
Olympic taekwondo practitioners of Argentina
Taekwondo practitioners at the 2004 Summer Olympics
Taekwondo practitioners at the 2008 Summer Olympics
People from Neuquén Province
Pan American Games gold medalists for Argentina
Pan American Games silver medalists for Argentina
Pan American Games bronze medalists for Argentina
Pan American Games medalists in taekwondo
Taekwondo practitioners at the 1995 Pan American Games
Taekwondo practitioners at the 1999 Pan American Games
Taekwondo practitioners at the 2003 Pan American Games
World Taekwondo Championships medalists
Medalists at the 2003 Pan American Games
21st-century Argentine women